The De Havilland Canada DHC-8, commonly known as the Dash 8, is a series of turboprop-powered regional airliners, introduced by de Havilland Canada (DHC) in 1984.  DHC was later bought by Boeing in 1988, then by Bombardier in 1992; then by Longview Aviation Capital in 2019, reviving the De Havilland Canada brand. Powered by two Pratt & Whitney Canada PW100s, it was developed from the Dash 7 with improved cruise performance and lower operational costs, but without STOL performance.  Three sizes were offered: initially the 37–40 seat -100 until 2005 and the more powerful -200 from 1995, the stretched 50–56 seats -300 from 1989, both until 2009, and the 68–90 seats -400 from 1999, still in production. The QSeries are post-1997 variants fitted with active noise control systems.

Development

Initial development

In the 1970s, de Havilland Canada had invested heavily in its Dash 7 project, concentrating on STOL and short-field performance, the company's traditional area of expertise. Using four medium-power engines with large, four-bladed propellers resulted in comparatively lower noise levels, which combined with its excellent STOL characteristics, made the Dash 7 suitable for operating from small in-city airports, a market DHC felt would be compelling. However, only a handful of air carriers employed the Dash 7, as most regional airlines were more interested in operational costs than short-field performance.

In 1980, de Havilland responded by dropping the short-field performance requirement and adapting the basic Dash 7 layout to use only two, more powerful engines. Its favoured engine supplier, Pratt & Whitney Canada, developed the new PW100 series engines for the role, more than doubling the power from its PT6. Originally designated the PT7A-2R engine, it later became the PW120. When the Dash 8 rolled out on April 19, 1983, more than 3,800 hours of testing had been accumulated over two years on five PW100 series test engines.
The Dash 8 first flight was on June 20, 1983.

Certification of the PW120 followed on December 16, 1983.

The airliner entered service in 1984 with NorOntair, and Piedmont Airlines, formerly Henson Airlines, was the first US customer the same year.

DHC resale

In 1986, Boeing bought the company in a bid to improve production at DHC's Downsview Airport plants, as well as better position itself to compete for a new Air Canada order for large intercontinental airliners. Air Canada was a crown corporation at the time, and both Boeing and Airbus were competing heavily via political channels for the contract. It was eventually won by Airbus, which received an order for 34 A320 aircraft in a highly controversial move. The allegations of bribery are today known as the Airbus affair. Following its failure in the competition, Boeing immediately put de Havilland Canada up for sale. The company was eventually purchased by Bombardier in 1992.

Q-Series, -400

The market for new aircraft to replace existing turboprops once again grew in the mid-1990s, and DHC responded with the improved "Series 400" design.

All Dash 8s delivered from the second quarter of 1996 (including all Series 400s) include the Active Noise and Vibration System designed to reduce cabin noise and vibration levels to nearly those of jet airliners. To emphasize their quietness, Bombardier renamed the Dash 8 models as the Q-Series turboprops (Q200, Q300, and Q400).

The last Dash 8-100, a -102, was built in 2005.

In April 2008, Bombardier announced that production of the classic versions (Series 100, 200, 300) would be ended, leaving the Series 400 as the only Dash 8 still in production.

Production of the Q200 and Q300 was to cease in May 2009.

A total of 671 Dash 8 classics were produced; the last one was delivered to Air Nelson in May 2008.
The 1,000th Dash 8 was delivered in November 2010.

Production

Bombardier aimed to produce the Q400 more economically. A deal with its machinists union in June 2017 allowed the assembly of the wings and cockpit section outside Canada and searches for potential partners commenced.
Bombardier expected to produce the cockpit section in its plant in Queretaro, Mexico, outsourcing the wings to China's Shenyang Aircraft Corp, which already builds the Q400's centre fuselage. The Q400 components are chemically milled while older variants are assembled from bonded panels and skins.

The production of Dash 8 Series 100 stopped in 2005. Later in 2009, Bombardier stopped the production of Series 100 and 200.

Proposed Q400X stretch 

Bombardier proposed development of a Q400 stretch with two plug-in segments, called the Q400X project, in 2007.
It would compete in the 90-seat market range.
In response to this project, ATR was studying a 90-seat stretch.

In June 2009, Bombardier commercial aircraft president Gary Scott indicated that the Q400X will be "definitely part of our future" for possible introduction in 2013–14, although he did not detail the size of the proposed version or commit to an introduction date.

As of July 2010, Bombardier's vice president, Phillipe Poutissou, made comments explaining the company was still studying the prospects of designing the Q400X and talking with potential customers.  At the time, Bombardier was not as committed to the Q400X as it had been previously. As of May 2011, Bombardier was still strongly committed to the stretch, but envisioned it as more likely as a 2015 or later launch, complicating launch date matters were new powerplants from GE and PWC to be introduced in 2016. As of February 2012, Bombardier was still studying the issue, but as of 2011, the launch date was no longer targeted for the 2014 range. At least a three-year delay was envisioned.

In October 2012, a joint development deal with a government-led South Korean consortium was revealed, to develop a 90-seater turboprop regional airliner, targeting a 2019 launch date. The consortium was to have included Korea Aerospace Industries and Korean Air Lines.

High-density, 90-seat Q400

At the February 2016 Singapore Airshow, Bombardier announced a high-density, 90-seat layout of the Q400, which should enter service in 2018; keeping the  seat pitch of the Nok Air 86-seats, an extra row of seats is allowed by changing the configuration of the front right door and moving back the aft pressure bulkhead.
By August 2018, the 90-seat variant was certified before delivery to launch customer SpiceJet later in the same year.
In March 2021, EASA certified the 90-seat variant for European operations; DHC believes that there are opportunities with current and prospective European customers.

Sale to Longview, reviving the De Havilland Canada name
On November 8, 2018, Viking Air parent Longview Aviation Capital Corporation acquired the entire Dash 8 program and the de Havilland brand from Bombardier, in a deal that would close by the second half of 2019.
Viking had already acquired the discontinued de Havilland Canada aircraft model type certificates in 2006.

By November 2018, the sales of the higher-performance Q400 were slower than the cheaper aircraft from ATR.
Bombardier announced the sale was for $300 million and expects $250 million net. The sale was projected by Bombardier to result in $250 million annual savings.

In January 2019, Longview announced that it would establish a new company in Ontario, reviving the de Havilland Aircraft Company of Canada name, to continue production of the Q400 and support the Dash 8 range.
By February, the program sale was expected to close at the end of September.

On June 3, 2019, the sale was closed with the newly formed De Havilland Canada (DHC) taking control of the Dash 8 program, including the previous -100, -200, and -300 series. Production of the Q400 was planned to continue at the Downsview, Toronto production facility, under DHC's management.
De Havilland is considering a 50-seat shrink, as North American airlines operate 870 ageing 50-seaters, mostly CRJs and Embraer ERJs.

There were 17 Dash 8s scheduled for delivery in 2021, and De Havilland could pause production after those, while the factory lease expires in 2023.

On February 17, 2021, DHC announced a pause in production, planned for the second half of 2021, due to lack of Dash 8 orders from airlines. The manufacturer planned to vacate its Downsview Toronto facility and lay off 500 employees in the process. The lay-off notice resulted in the union representing the workers demanding a government bail-out. The company plans to restart production after the pandemic at a new location.
In July 2022, DHC announced that it would review the Dash 8 programme and supply chain later in the year, and could restart production in the middle of the decade if conditions allow. The Calgary site, where the company produces DHC-6 Twin Otters, would be the likely venue. Potential updates, including hydrogen-electric propulsion, will be studied.

A Dash 8 reported to be the last of the type was delivered to Air Tanzania in August 2021. However, the completion of aircraft was later resumed and TAAG Angola received its fifth aircraft in January 2022.

Design

Distinguishing features of the Dash 8 design are the large T-tail intended to keep the tail free of prop wash during takeoff, a very high aspect ratio wing, the elongated engine nacelles also holding the rearward-folding landing gear, and the pointed nose profile.

The Dash 8 design has better cruise performance than the Dash 7, is less expensive to operate, and is much less expensive to maintain, due largely to having only two engines.

Regional jet competition
The introduction of the regional jet altered the sales picture. Although more expensive than turboprops, regional jets allow airlines to operate passenger services on routes not suitable for turboprops. Turboprop aircraft have lower fuel consumption and can operate from shorter runways than regional jets, but have higher engine maintenance costs, shorter ranges, and slower cruising speeds.

When world oil prices drove up short-haul airfares in 2006, an increasing number of airlines that had bought regional jets began to reassess turboprop regional airliners, which use about 30–60% less fuel than regional jets. Although the market was not as robust as in the 1980s when the first Dash 8s were introduced, 2007 had increased sales of the only two 40+ seat regional turboprops still in western production, Bombardier's Q400 and its competitor, the ATR series of 50– to 70-seat turboprops. The Q400 has a cruising speed close to that of most regional jets, and its mature engines and systems require less frequent maintenance, reducing its disadvantage.

Variants

The aircraft has been delivered in four series. The Series 100 has a maximum capacity of 39, the Series 200 has the same capacity but offers more powerful engines, the Series 300 is a stretched, 50-seat version, and the Series 400 is further stretched to a maximum of 90 passengers. Models delivered after 1997 have cabin noise suppression and are designated with the prefix "Q". Production of the Series 100 ceased in 2005, followed by the 200 and 300 in 2009, leaving the Q400 as the only series still in production.

Series 100

The Series 100 was the original 37- to 39-passenger version of the Dash 8 that entered service in 1984. The original engine was the Pratt & Whitney Canada PW120 and later units used the PW121. Rated engine power is 1,800 shp (1,340 kW).

DHC-8-101
1984 variant powered by either two PW120 or PW120A engines and a 33,000 lb (15,000 kg) takeoff weight.

1986 variant powered by either two PW120A or PW121 engines and a 34,500 lb (15,650 kg) takeoff weight.

1987 variant powered by two PW121 engines and a 34,500 lb (15,650 kg) takeoff weight (can be modified for a 35,200 lb [15,950 kg] take-off weight)
DHC-8-102A
1990 variant powered by two PW120A engines with revised Heath Tecna interior.

1992 variant powered by two PW121 engines and a 36,300 lb (16,450 kg) takeoff weight.
DHC-8-100PF
DHC-8-100 converted to a freighter by Voyageur Aviation, with a  cargo capacity.
DHC-8M-100
Two aircraft for Maritime Pollution Surveillance, operated by Transport Canada, equipped with the MSS 6000 Surveillance system.
CC-142
Military transport version for the Canadian Forces in Europe.
CT-142
Military navigation training version for the Canadian Forces.  Used to train Canadian and allied nation's ACSOs and AESOPs 

E-9A Widget
A United States Air Force range control aircraft that ensures that the overwater military ranges in the Gulf of Mexico are clear of civilian boats and aircraft during live fire tests of air-launched missiles and other hazardous military activities. Aircraft operate out of Tyndall Air Force Base, Florida, with two aircraft assigned to the 82nd Aerial Targets Squadron for the support of training missions.

Series 200

The Series 200 aircraft maintained the same 37–39 passenger airframe as the original Series 100, but was re-engined for improved performance. The Series 200 used the more powerful Pratt & Whitney Canada PW123 engines rated at 2,150 shp (1,600 kW).
DHC-8-201
1995 variant powered by two PW123C engines.

1995 variant powered by two PW123D engines.
Q200
Version of the DHC-8-200 with the ANVS (Active Noise and Vibration Suppression) system.

In 2000, its unit cost was US$12 million.

Series 300

The Series 300 introduced a longer airframe that was stretched  over the Series 100/200 and has a passenger capacity of 50–56. The Series 300 also used the Pratt & Whitney Canada PW123 engines. Rated engine power is between 2,380 shp (1,774 kW) and 2,500 shp (1,864 kW). Design service life is 80,000 flight cycles. Under an extended service program launched in 2017, the service life of Dash 8-300 is extended by 50 per cent, or approximately 15 years, to 120,000 flight cycles.

1989 variant powered by two PW123 engines

1990 variant powered by two PW123A engines with revised Heath Tecna interior.  In addition, the landing gear design changed to a slightly swept back design intended to prevent tail strikes.

1992 variant powered by two PW123B engines

1995 variant powered by two PW123E engines
DHC-8-300A
Version of the DHC-8-300 with increased payload.
Q300
Version of the DHC-8-300 with the ANVS (Active Noise and Vibration Suppression) system.
DHC-8-300 MSA
Upgraded variant with L-3 for maritime surveillance platform.
RO-6A
United States military designation for the DHC-8-315 for the United States Army as a reconnaissance platform.
C-147A
United States military designation for the DHC-8-315 for the United States Army as a jump platform 

In 2000, its unit cost was US$14.3 million.

Series 400

The Series 400 introduced an even longer airframe that was stretched  over the Series 300 ( over the Series 100/200), has a larger, stouter T-tail and has a passenger capacity of 68–90. The Series 400 uses Pratt & Whitney Canada PW150A engines rated at 4,850 shp (3,620 kW). The aircraft has a cruise speed of 360 knots (667 km/h), which is 60–90 knots (111–166 km/h) higher than its predecessors. The maximum operating altitude is 25,000 ft (7,600 m) for the standard version, although a version with drop-down oxygen masks is offered, which increases maximum operating altitude to 27,000 ft (8,200 m).

Between its service entry in 2000 and the 2018 sale to Longview/Viking, 585 have been delivered at a rate of 30-35 per year, leaving a backlog of 65, for a market value at a stable level of $21 million new.

DHC-8-400
1999 variant with a maximum of 68 passengers.
DHC-8-401
1999 variant with a maximum of 70 passengers.

1999 variant with a maximum of 78 passengers.
Q400
Stretched and improved 70–78 passenger version that entered service in 2000. All Q400s include the ANVS (Active Noise and Vibration Suppression) system.

Version of the Q400 with updated cabins, lighting, windows, overhead bins, landing gear, as well as reduced fuel and maintenance costs.
In 2013, an Extra Capacity variant was introduced, capable of carrying a maximum of 86 passengers. The Extra Capacity variant was updated in 2016 with more closely spaced seats to carry up to 90 passengers. The first 90-seat aircraft was delivered to launch customer SpiceJet in September 2018.

Two Q400 aircraft adapted to the water bombing role as aerial firefighting air tankers by Cascade Aerospace for the French Sécurité Civile.
DHC-8 MPA-D8
2007 converted for use as a maritime patrol aircraft. PAL Aerospace partnered to offer this variant as DHC-8 MPA P4.
DHC-8-402PF
Q400CC
Cargo combi. Seats 50 passengers plus  of payload. First delivered to launch customer Ryukyu Air Commuter in 2015.

In 2017, its unit cost was US$32.2 million.

Operators

By 2017, the Q400 aircraft had logged 7 million flight hours with 60 operators and transported over 400 million passengers with a dispatch reliability over 99.5%.

By July 2018,  Dash 8s were in airline service: 143 Series 100 with 35 operators, 42 Series 200 with 16 operators, 151 Series 300 with 32 operators and 508 Q400s.
By then, 56 orders were in backlog.

Orders and deliveries

Accidents and incidents

The DHC-8 has been involved in 80 aviation accidents and incidents including 31 hull losses.
Those resulted in  fatalities.

Accidents with fatalities

Hull losses

 April 15, 1988: Horizon Air Flight 2658, operated by DHC-8-102 N819PH suffered an engine fire on climb-out from Seattle/Tacoma International Airport. An emergency landing was made but the aircraft struck equipment on the ground before crashing into two jetways. N819PH was destroyed by fire; there were no fatalities.
 November 23, 2009: a DHC-8-200, being operated on behalf of United States Africa Command, made an emergency landing at Tarakigné, Mali and was substantially damaged when the undercarriage collapsed and the starboard wing was ripped off. The accident was caused by the aircraft running out of fuel 29 seconds before the crash. The captain had opted not to refuel at the previous departure airport.
 April 9, 2012: Air Tanzania Dash 8 5H-MWG was written off at Kigoma Airport, Tanzania in an aborted take off. All 39 people on board survived.
 September 30, 2015: Luxair Flight 9562 experienced an aborted takeoff accident at Saarbrücken Airport in Germany. The Bombardier Q400 LX-LGH was damaged beyond repair when it settled back onto the runway after the gear was raised prematurely. The aircraft slid 2,400 feet and came to a stop with more than 1,100 feet remaining of the 6,562 foot paved runway. None of the 20 occupants were injured.
 May 8, 2019: Biman Bangladesh Airlines Flight 60, a Dash-8 Q400 slid off Runway 21 at Yangon International Airport, Burma, and broke into three pieces as it performed a go-around on landing. The flight originated in Dhaka, Bangladesh. Poor weather was cited as a contributing factor. At least 17 people were injured.

Major landing gear accidents

In September 2007, two separate accidents of similar landing gear failures occurred within four days of each other on Scandinavian Airlines (SAS) Dash 8-Q400 aircraft. A third accident occurred in October 2007, leading to the withdrawal of the type from the airline's fleet.

On September 9, 2007, the crew of SAS Flight 1209, en route from Copenhagen to Aalborg, reported problems with the locking mechanism of the right side landing gear, and Aalborg Airport was prepared for an emergency landing. Shortly after touchdown the right main gear collapsed and the airliner skidded off the runway while fragments of the right propeller shot against the cabin and the right engine caught fire. Of 69 passengers and four crew on board, 11 were sent to hospital, five with minor injuries. The accident was filmed by a local news channel (TV2-Nord) and broadcast live on national television.

Three days later, on September 12, Scandinavian Airlines Flight 2748 from Copenhagen to Palanga had a similar problem with the landing gear, forcing the aircraft to land in Vilnius international airport (Lithuania). No passengers or crew were injured. Immediately after this accident SAS grounded all 33 Q400 airliners in its fleet and, a few hours later, Bombardier recommended that all Q400s with more than 10,000 flights be grounded until further notice. This affected about 60 aircraft, out of 140 Q400s then in service.

On October 27, 2007, Scandinavian Airlines Flight 2867 en route from Bergen to Copenhagen had severe problems with the landing gear during landing in Kastrup Airport. The right wing gear did not deploy properly (or partially), and the aircraft skidded off the runway in a controlled emergency landing. The Q400 was carrying 38 passengers, two infants and four crew members on board. No injuries were reported. The next day, SAS permanently removed its entire Dash 8 Q400 fleet from service. In a press release on October 28, 2007, the company's president said: "Confidence in the Q400 has diminished considerably and our customers are becoming increasingly doubtful about flying in this type of aircraft. Accordingly, with the Board of Directors' approval, I have decided to immediately remove Dash 8 Q400 aircraft from service." The preliminary Danish investigation determined the latest Q400 incident was unrelated to the airline's earlier corrosion problems, in this particular case caused by a misplaced O-ring found blocking the orifice in the restrictor valve.

In all, eight Q400s had landing gear failures while landing during 2007: four in Denmark, one in Germany, one in Japan, one in Lithuania and one in South Korea. In November 2007, it was revealed that the Swedish Civil Aviation Administration  had begun an investigation and found Scandinavian Airlines System culpable of cutting corners in its maintenance department. The airline reportedly made 2,300 flights in which safety equipment was not up to standard. On March 10, 2008, SAS ordered 27 more aircraft from Bombardier in a compensation deal: 14 Q400 NextGen turboprops and 13 CRJ900 jets.

On February 23, 2017, a Flybe Q400 suffered a right hand gear collapse while landing at Amsterdam Schiphol Airport. There were no injuries. The cause was identified as a deformed righthand main landing gear brace, which had been installed the night before. It is not known when the deformation had occurred.

On November 10, 2017, a Flybe flight BE331, operated by a Q400, was scheduled to fly from George Best Belfast City Airport to Inverness Airport. The plane reported a technical problem shortly after takeoff and was diverted to Belfast International Airport, where it landed on its nose with the front gear retracted. One minor injury was reported.

On August 19, 2018, a Q400-200 of LC Peru on a flight from Lima to Ayacucho had to return to Lima and make an emergency landing due to a nose gear that could not be lowered. The aircraft landed without the nose gear down.

On November 15, 2018, a Q300-315 belonging to PAL Airlines was unable to lower its nose gear while trying to land at Deer Lake, Newfoundland, diverted to Stephenville, Newfoundland and carried out a nose gear up landing.

Specifications

See also

References

Notes

Bibliography

 Eden, Paul E. Civil Aircraft Today: The World's Most Successful Commercial Aircraft. London: Amber Books, 2008. .
 Hotson, Fred W. The De Havilland Canada Story. Toronto: Canav Books, 1983. .
 Kinsey, I. "Dash 8 is Born". Canadian Aviation Magazine, June 1983.
 Winchester, Jim. "De Havilland Canada DHC-8 Dash 8". Civil Aircraft (The Aviation Factfile). London: Grange Books plc, 2004. .

External links

 
 
 
 
 
 
 

DHC-8
Dash 8
1980s Canadian airliners
High-wing aircraft
Twin-turboprop tractor aircraft
 
T-tail aircraft
Aircraft first flown in 1983